"Mona Lisa Overdrive" is a composition in B-flat minor, featured in the movie The Matrix Reloaded, during the highway chase scene. It is written by Don Davis in collaboration with the electronica act Juno Reactor, representing a blend of film score music and trance. The track is the fifth entry in the second CD in the film soundtrack, released on 15 May 2003. 
A different version of the song is featured in Juno Reactor's 2004 album, Labyrinth. A remix of the song was produced by Thomas P. Heckmann and was included on the group's remix album Inside the Reactor in 2011.

The song title is derived from William Gibson's cyberpunk novel of the same name, published in 1988. The Matrix franchise was heavily influenced by Gibson's writing.

Personnel
Don Davis – conductor, orchestration
Taz Alexander – vocals
Scarlet – guitar
Greg Ellis – percussion
Mabi Thobejane – percussion
Mike Fisher – percussion
Zig Gron – editing
Greg Hunter – engineer
Scott Oyster – engineer

References

2003 compositions
2003 songs
Compositions in B-flat minor
Songs written for films
The Matrix (franchise) music